The Kenosha North Pier lighthouse or Kenosha Light is a lighthouse located near Kenosha in Kenosha County, Wisconsin.  "A typical 'Lake Michigan red tower'", it is a sibling to the Milwaukee Pierhead Light.  This light was built in 1906 as a replacement for the old Kenosha Light. It was listed on the National register of Historic Places in 2008.

History
The station was established in 1856.  This pierhead light is one of a succession of lighthouses in this location, which were needed as the structures were destroyed by natural processes, or became obsolete as the piers were greatly extended.

The current lighthouse was built in 1906. It stands 50 feet tall, with a gently tapered shape, topped with a cylindrical lantern. The walls of the tower are cast iron plates. Inside the tower, the first story is 12 feet six inches in diameter. From the first story, a curving cast iron stairway ascends to the second story. The third story contains meteorological equipment which is connected to the lantern above. A steel ladder leads to a trapdoor in the ceiling. The fourth story is the lantern room, which contains a modern acrylic beacon.

Located on the north pier, the pierhead light is listed in the United States Coast Guard light list and the United States Geological Survey Geographic Names Information System as the Kenosha Light. It currently is painted red, but the lighthouse also has been painted white in the past. The adjacent south pier and breakwater also had lighthouses, but now have cylindrical navigational lights.  These included fog signal buildings and elevated iron catwalks, all of which have been removed.

In June 2008, the Kenosha Pierhead Lighthouse was deemed "excess" by the Coast Guard.  Pursuant to the National Historic Lighthouse Preservation Act of 2000, it was offered at no cost to eligible entities, including federal, state and local agencies, non-profit corporations, educational agencies, or community development organizations. A deadline of July 21 was created for qualified organizations to express interest. At this time, no organization came forward.

In 2011, the excess property was put up for auction and was purchased by Heather McGee and John Burhani. The lighthouse is currently being used as an art studio and gallery as its name now conveys; Kenosha Lighthouse Studio. Art shows, open to the public, can be found on the kenoshalighthousestudio.com website.  The Kenosha Lighthouse Studio is open for individual dinners/meetings and other events.

Directions
In Kenosha, cross the bridge to the island on 50th Street, and follow the road down to the beach  at Simmons Island.  From the beach, one can walk on the pier.  The light is accessible for exterior inspection, but not open to the public.

See also
Kenosha Light - Near the north pier, on Simmons Island

References

Further reading

 Havighurst, Walter (1943) The Long Ships Passing: The Story of the Great Lakes, Macmillan Publishers.
 Oleszewski, Wes, Great Lakes Lighthouses, American and Canadian: A Comprehensive Directory/Guide to Great Lakes Lighthouses, (Gwinn, Michigan: Avery Color Studios, Inc., 1998) .
 
 Sapulski, Wayne S., (2001) Lighthouses of Lake Michigan: Past and Present (Paperback) (Fowlerville: Wilderness Adventure Books) ; .
 Wright, Larry and Wright, Patricia, Great Lakes Lighthouses Encyclopedia Hardback (Erin: Boston Mills Press, 2006) .

External links

Kenosha History Center.
Lighthouse friends article.
Satellite view, North Pier Lighthouse at Google earth.
kenoshalighthousestudio.com
Terry Pepper, Seeing the Light, Kenosha Pierhead & Breakwater Lights.

Wobser, David, Kenosha North Pier Head Light, Boatnerd

National Register of Historic Places in Kenosha County, Wisconsin
Lighthouses completed in 1906
Buildings and structures in Kenosha, Wisconsin
Lighthouses in Wisconsin
Piers in Wisconsin
Tourist attractions in Kenosha County, Wisconsin
1906 establishments in Wisconsin